Batton Lash (October 29, 1953 – January 12, 2019) was an American comics creator who came to prominence as part of the 1990s self-publishing boom. He is best known for the series Wolff and Byrd, Counselors of the Macabre (a.k.a. Supernatural Law), a comedic series about law partners specializing in cases dealing with archetypes from the horror genre, which ran as a strip in The National Law Journal, and as a stand-alone series of comic books and graphic novels. He received several awards for his work, including an Inkpot Award, an Independent Book Publishers Association's Benjamin Franklin Award, an Eisner Award, and nominations for two Harvey Awards.

Career
Batton Lash was born Vito Marangi in Brooklyn, New York, and studied cartooning and graphic arts at Manhattan's School of Visual Arts.

In 1979, he began writing and drawing Wolff and Byrd, Counselors of the Macabre, as a weekly newspaper strip which appeared in The Brooklyn Paper until 1996 and The National Law Journal from 1983 to 1997. In 1980 Lash was a courtroom sketch artist during the trial against John Gotti. In 1994, he and his wife Jackie Estrada founded Exhibit A Press to publish the series as a full-length comic book stories, renaming it Supernatural Law. It was later made available as a digital download on the Comics+ and Graphicly apps.

In 1994 he wrote Archie Meets the Punisher, a well-received crossover between the teen characters of Archie Comics and Marvel Comics' grim antihero the Punisher. He wrote eight issues of Radioactive Man for Bongo Comics, which received an Eisner Award for Best Humor Publication in 2002.

In 2009 he began working with writer James Hudnall on "Obama Nation", a conservative political comic strip on Andrew Breitbart's website BigGovernment. The series drew national attention in 2011, when MSNBC commentator Lawrence O'Donnell criticized one of the strips as racist, accusing it of caricaturing Barack and Michelle Obama using stereotypes of African Americans.

Death
He died at his home on January 12, 2019, from brain cancer at the age of 65.

Awards and nominations
1996: Don Thompson Award – Best Achievement by a Cartoonist (tie)
1997: Don Thompson Award – Best Achievement by a Writer & Artist
2002: Radioactive Man – Eisner Award for Best Humor Publication
2003: Mister Negativity and Other Tales of Supernatural Law – nominated for Harvey Special Award for Humor
2003: Supernatural Law #35 – nominated for Harvey Award for Best Single Issue
2004: Inkpot Award
2009: The Soddyssey, And Other Tales of Supernatural Law – Independent Book Publishers Association's Benjamin Franklin Award for Graphic Novel

Bibliography

Comics
 Wolff and Byrd, Counselors of the Macabre #1-23
 Mavis #1-3 (featuring Wolff and Byrd's secretary)
 Supernatural Law #24-45
 Radioactive Man volume 2 (eight issues)
 Simpsons Super Spectacular #1-5
 Archie Meets the Punisher, one-shot
 Archie Comics "The House of Riverdale"
 Archie Comics "Archie Freshman Year"
The Big Book of Death (contributor)
The Big Book of Weirdos (contributor)
The Big Book of Urban Legends (contributor)
The Big Book of Thugs (contributor)

Collections
 Wolff & Byrd, Counselors of the Macabre—"The Red Book" (comic strips from the mid-80s)
 Wolff & Byrd, Counselors of the Macabre: Supernatural Law (comic strips)
 Wolff & Byrd, Counselors of the Macabre: Case Files Volumes I-IV (#1-16)
 Tales of Supernatural Law (#1-8)
 The Soddyssey, And Other Tales of Supernatural Law (#9-16)
 Sonovawitch! and Other Tales of Supernatural Law (#17-22, Mavis #1)
 The Vampire Brat, And Other Tales of Supernatural Law (#23-29, Mavis #2)
 Mister Negativity, And Other Tales of Supernatural Law (#31-36, Mavis #3)

References 

1953 births
2019 deaths
Writers from Brooklyn
American webcomic creators
American cartoonists
American comics artists
Courtroom sketch artists
Deaths from cancer in California
Deaths from brain cancer in the United States
Inkpot Award winners